Pavel Peniu (born 29 June 1953) is a Romanian former footballer. He also worked as president at Farul Constanța and at Gheorghe Hagi's team Viitorul Constanța.

International career
Pavel Peniu played one game at international level for Romania in a 6–1 victory against Greece.

Notes

Honours
Chimia Râmnicu Vâlcea
Divizia B: 1973–74
FC Constanța
Divizia B: 1980–81

References

External links

1953 births
Living people
Romanian footballers
Romania international footballers
Association football midfielders
Liga I players
Liga II players
FCV Farul Constanța players
FCM Târgoviște players
FC Delta Dobrogea Tulcea players
Chimia Râmnicu Vâlcea players
Romanian sports executives and administrators